Kunovci is a village near Tokoljak in the Srebrenica municipality, Republika Srpska, Bosnia and Herzegovina Bosnia and Herzegovina.

References

Populated places in Bugojno